The Capt. Francis A. Hendry House is a historic site in LaBelle, Florida. It is located at 512 Fraser Street. On February 5, 1998, it was added to the U.S. National Register of Historic Places. The Frame Vernacular house was built for Captain Francis Hendry, LaBelle's founder and county namesake. It is the only surviving building associated with Hendry in the county.

References

External links

 Hendry County listings at National Register of Historic Places
 Florida's Office of Cultural and Historical Programs
 Famous Floridians of LaBelle

Houses in Hendry County, Florida
Houses on the National Register of Historic Places in Florida
Vernacular architecture in Florida
National Register of Historic Places in Hendry County, Florida
1914 establishments in Florida
Houses completed in 1914